Mount Nebo is a rural locality in the Moreton Bay Region, Queensland, Australia.

Geography

Mount Nebo is a mountain approximately  North West of the Brisbane suburb of The Gap in Queensland, Australia. It is part of the D'Aguilar Range which includes other mountains such as Mount Pleasant, Mount Glorious and Mount Mee.  The mountain is the source of Enoggera Creek.

History
The locality of Mount Nebo is named after the mountain on which it is located.

European settlement began in 1919 with the subdivision of the Highlands Estate into smaller blocks for soldiers returning from World War I. For a number of years the community belonged to the Shire of Esk, but between 1932 and 1936 a redrawing of the boundaries brought Mount Nebo into the Shire of Pine Rivers. The 2008 amalgamation of local councils means it now falls within the Moreton Bay Region.

Mount Nebo opened in 16 February 1931. The school had a number of temporary closures from 31 December 1934 to 11 April 1939, from  30 September 1940 to 23 October 1940, 18 August 1941 to 19 August 1946 and 5 November 1948 to 21 June 1954.

The median age of the Mount Nebo population was 42 years, 5 years above the national median of 37. 76.6% of people living in Mount Nebo were born in Australia. The other top responses for country of birth were England 11.1%, New Zealand 3.5%, France 1.4%, South Africa 1.2%, United States of America 1.2%. 94.2% of people spoke only English at home; the next most common languages were 1.4% French, 1.2% Dhivehi, 0.7% German, 0.7% Hebrew. The most common religious affiliation was "No Religion" (49.0%); the next most common responses were Catholic 14.3%, Anglican 8.5%, Uniting Church 5.1% and Buddhism 3.5%.

Amenities 
The Moreton Bay Regional Council operates a mobile library service which visits the Mount Nebo Rural Fire Shed on Mount Nebo Rd.

Education 
Mount Nebo State School is a government primary (Prep-6) school for boys and girls at Mount Nebo Road. In 2017, the school had an enrolment of 30 students with 6 teachers (3 full-time equivalent) and 6 non-teaching staff (3 full-time equivalent).

References

External links

Nebo
Suburbs of Moreton Bay Region
Localities in Queensland